The Madrid Historic District is a national historic district that designates the majority of the buildings in the 19th-century mining town of Madrid, New Mexico.

The district's nomination to the National Register of Historic Places was accompanied by photographs showing several contributing structures: the Roman Catholic church on Back Road; a former boarding house; a coal breaker; miners' houses on Opera House Road and Back Road; and company bungalows, other houses and the company headquarters on Main (Front) Street (now NM 14).

See also

National Register of Historic Places listings in Santa Fe County, New Mexico

References

Sources
  
 
 

Historic districts on the National Register of Historic Places in New Mexico
Geography of Santa Fe County, New Mexico
History of Santa Fe County, New Mexico
Residential buildings on the National Register of Historic Places in New Mexico
Northern Rio Grande National Heritage Area
National Register of Historic Places in Santa Fe, New Mexico